The Hong Kong Lesbian & Gay Film Festival (HKLGFF) is an annual LGBT-focused film festival, held each September in Hong Kong. It is reputedly the oldest LGBT film festival in Asia, having been founded in 1989.

Background
The Hong Kong Lesbian & Gay Film Festival seeks to present rare contemporary and historical films on a wide range of LGBT topics from Hong Kong and across the world. Its activities are directed by the Hong Kong Lesbian and Gay Film Festival Foundation, which states that it "seeks to promote equal opportunities and eliminate discrimination against sexual minority groups in Hong Kong through cinematic works of art". The Festival is screened annually each September, and in Chinese is known as the Hong Kong Tongzhi Film Festival, with both the title and the resurrection of the word tongzhi, which translates into English as Comrades, the idea of one of its first organisers, Edward Lam (林奕華).

History
Hong Kong Lesbian & Gay Film Festival was founded by Edward Lam in 1989 and sponsored by the Hong Kong Arts Centre. It was held annually until 1999, when it was cancelled due to low ticket sales. In 2000, Wouter Barendrecht and Ray Yeung (楊曜愷) resurrected the film festival. They created the Hong Kong Lesbian & Gay Film Festival Society in 2001, so that the film festival could find its own funding and not be reliant on Hong Kong Arts Centre.

Screening venues
 AMC Cinema, Festival Walk, Kowloon Tong
 Broadway Cinematheque, 3 Public Square Street, Yau Ma Tei
 IFC Palace, IFC Mall, 8 Broadway, Central
 Kee Club – 6/F, 32 Wellington Street, Central
 University of Hong Kong, Mid-Levels, Central
 Zafran – Basement, 43–55 Wyndham Street, Central

See also
 List of LGBT film festivals

References

1989 establishments in Hong Kong
Annual events in China
Annual events in Hong Kong
Film festivals established in 1989
Film festivals in Hong Kong
LGBT film festivals in China
LGBT in Hong Kong